Bruno Medeiros Grassi (born 5 March 1987) is a Brazilian professional footballer who plays for Saudi Arabian club Jeddah as a goalkeeper.

Football career
Born in Tubarão, Santa Catarina, 20-year-old Grassi arrived in Portugal in January 2008 and signed with C.S. Marítimo from Sport Club Internacional, along with teammate João Guilherme. He acted as third-choice during his early years, also playing with the reserves in the third division. On 7 December 2008 he made his first-team – and Primeira Liga – debut, conceding all six goals in a 0–6 home loss against S.L. Benfica after starter Marcos (his compatriot) was sent off in the 18th minute.

For 2009–10, Grassi was loaned to third level side G.D. Tourizense, being released by the Madeira club at the end of the season and resuming his career in his country's lower leagues. On 22 April 2015 he signed a two-year deal with Grêmio Foot-Ball Porto Alegrense, initially as a backup to Marcelo Grohe.

On 23 July 2022, Grassi joined Saudi Arabian club Jeddah.

Career statistics

Honours
Grêmio
Copa do Brasil: 2016
Copa Libertadores: 2017
Recopa Sudamericana: 2018

References

External links

1987 births
Living people
Sportspeople from Santa Catarina (state)
Brazilian footballers
Association football goalkeepers
Campeonato Brasileiro Série A players
Campeonato Brasileiro Série B players
Campeonato Brasileiro Série C players
Sport Club Internacional players
Ypiranga Futebol Clube players
Sport Club São Paulo players
Araripina Futebol Clube players
Mogi Mirim Esporte Clube players
Esporte Clube Passo Fundo players
Águia de Marabá Futebol Clube players
Esporte Clube Cruzeiro players
Grêmio Foot-Ball Porto Alegrense players
Criciúma Esporte Clube players
Primeira Liga players
Segunda Divisão players
Saudi First Division League players
C.S. Marítimo players
G.D. Tourizense players
Jeddah Club players
Brazilian expatriate footballers
Expatriate footballers in Portugal
Brazilian expatriate sportspeople in Portugal
Expatriate footballers in Saudi Arabia
Brazilian expatriate sportspeople in Saudi Arabia